The Feuerwehr (German: fire defence) is a number of German fire departments. The responsible bodies for operating and equipping fire departments are the German communities ("Gemeinden") and cities ("Städte"). By law, they are required to operate fire-fighting forces. In cities, this is usually performed by the Fire Prevention Bureau, one of the higher-ranking authorities.

There are three kinds of recruiting firefighters in Germany: the predominant number of Germany's 1,383,730 firefighters are members of voluntary fire brigades (Freiwillige Feuerwehr), a lesser number working in professional fire brigades and at least the drafted members of a Compulsory Fire Service (Pflichtfeuerwehr), established just in a few places nationwide.

Professional fire brigades are usually operated as
 Berufsfeuerwehr (professional fire station or brigade) of a municipal body counting over 100,000 citizens, such as the city of Berlin as a full-time city department
 Werkfeuerwehr (plant fire station or brigade) of a larger company, for the needs of the company operating them by law e.g. refineries or chemical industry production facilities
 Betriebsfeuerwehr (factory fire station or brigade) of a larger company, that does not need to run a Werkfeuerwehr by law, but if it is required for the insurance coverage
 Flughafenfeuerwehr (airport fire station or brigade) as airports have to meet the ICAO requirements, this includes airplane factories like that of Airbus in Hamburg)
 Bundeswehr-Feuerwehr (armed forces fire station or brigade) with specialized divisions such as Fliegerhorstfeuerwehr Cologne-Wahn located at German air force bases, military bases, naval bases as well as on any ship of the German Navy
By law, cities with a population of more than 80,000–100,000 people (depending on the state) are required to have a professional fire-fighting force ("Berufsfeuerwehr"). Others such as smaller cities and towns can set up a full-time force ("Hauptamtliche Wachbereitschaft"), which is basically a group or a squadron occupying one large fire station around the clock.  This force deals with smaller incidents on its own and is supported by voluntary forces for larger incidents. Each community meets the need of fire-fighting personnel by setting up a voluntary force ("Freiwillige Feuerwehr"). A community or a city may also set up a professional fire fighting force without additional volunteer forces. In case it is not possible to recruit enough personnel for this job, the mayor of a city is required to set up a "Pflichtfeuerwehr" (compulsory fire brigade), where he will draft the number of personnel required.

Organisation

Tactical units

Overview
Voluntary and professional fire brigades usually share the same basic layout when deploying. Firefighters are organized in tactical units as follows:

In contrast to the United States system, there is no division into engine and ladder companies.

Organization of a Gruppe (group) or Staffel (squadron)
Most standard procedures in German firefighting are based on the Gruppe (group), since it is the smallest tactical unit to work independently. The also common Staffel (squadron) is basically a group stripped down to the absolutely necessary minimum, which can easily be extended to a Gruppe by joining with a three-firefighter Trupp (squad) from another vehicle. Due to the financial situation of most German cities, the squadron is the most common unit for professional fire-fighting forces, because it provides sufficient manpower but saves three firefighters in comparison to a group.

The standard procedures for fire and technical aid and rescue assign certain tasks to certain crew members. This helps keeping the orders the unit commander has to give short and simple, since those tasks don't need to be specifically assigned to anyone.
However, most of these guidelines date back to a time when Self-contained breathing apparatus was not widespread. Thus, if SCBA is applied, the procedure has to be adapted.

Personnel
Members of the professional fire departments and volunteer fire departments serve in a hierarchy corresponding to other German institutions e.g. the police.

Volunteer fire fighters
The volunteer firefighters ranks are as follows (with deviations depending on the federal state):

Firefighters
 Feuerwehrmannanwärter (FMA)/trainee fresh to the fire brigade, at least 18 years old (16 years in some German states).
 Feuerwehrmann (FM)/Firefighter after the first part of the basic training.
 Oberfeuerwehrmann (OFM) after the second part of the basic training and after at least two years as Feuerwehrmann (FM)
 Hauptfeuerwehrmann (HFM) after being Oberfeuerwehrmann (OFM) for five years.

Leaders
 Löschmeister (LM) after being Hauptfeuerwehrmann for ten years or/and qualification "group leader" (Gruppenführer).
 Oberlöschmeister (OLM) after being Löschmeister for ten years or/and qualification "platoon leader" (Zugführer).
 Unterbrandmeister (UBM)(does not exist in Baden-Wuerttemberg, in Bavaria it's called "Hauptlöschmeister", HLM) with completed training to leading a squad or platoon squad and at least one year being Oberfeuerwehrmann (OFM).
 Brandmeister (BM) after at least two years as Unterbrandmeister (UBM) and two weeks training at the county's fire school (F3). Allowed to command a squadron or group.
 Oberbrandmeister (OBM) at least two years as Brandmeister (BM)
 Hauptbrandmeister (HBM) at least five years as Oberbrandmeister (OBM)
 Brandinspektor (BI)  after a training at the county's fire school (F4). Allowed to command a platoon. Must have been Oberbrandmeister (OBM) before.
 Brandoberinspektor (BOI) ( after a training at the countys fireschool (F/B5). Allowed to command severals platoons. Must have been Brandinspektor (BI) before.
 Ranks differ between states because each state is responsible for providing and admitting its own fire services as Thuringia i.e. provides education and administration of all fire brigades in Thuringia and Saxony provides it for all brigades in Saxony and so on.

Professional fire fighters
In Germany there are three career groups for fire fighters. They are governed by state laws for civil servants.

Overview

Medium grades

 Brandmeister i.a. (in reversionary) in the most states this is the professional starting rank. This grade requires vocational training in a useful job (mostly craft or industrial)
 Brandmeister (in Baden-Wuerttemberg, this is the first grade) the same conditions as Brandmeister i.a.
The firefighters start with an 18-month training time which ends with test. The use of Brandmeister is dependent of the size of the fire department they are working for. In bigger departments mostly as water squad in smaller departments also as attack squad or engine operator.
 Oberbrandmeister used as water squad (leader) and attack squad, engine operator
 Hauptbrandmeister (in bigger fire departments attack squad leader in smaller also unit leader) ladder operator

Executive grades

 Brandinspektor i.A
Condition to start directly in this grade is a college degree, starting with a 24-month training and end a test.
 Brandinspektor used mostly as unit leader (engine)
 Brandoberinspektor Brandamtmann, Brandamtsrat and Brandoberamtsrat, used mostly as platoon leaders.

 Senior civil service
 Brandreferendar z.a/-assessor, a master's degree is required to start directly in this grade.
 Brandrat, Oberbrandrat (some states: Brandoberrat), Branddirektor and Leitender Branddirektor. These grades are use in the functions of division chief/deputy/deputy assistant oder chief/commissioner assistant chief/commissioner, chief/commissioner dependent of the size of the city they are working for.

In cities with more than 400,000 people the top position of Direktor der Feuerwehr (NRW), Landesbranddirektor (Berlin), Oberbranddirektor (Hamburg, München), Direktor der Branddirektion (Hessen) or Stadtdirektor (Baden-Württemberg (Stuttgart)) exists.

Rank insignia in Rheinland-Pfalz
 Medium grades

Executive grades

Senior civil service

Vehicles
Technically, there are eleven types of vehicles in service today. However, due to regional needs and availability, there are a vast number of different vehicles in use.
The eleven standardized types are: (Incident command vehicle referred to »Battalion chief«)

This type has 3 subtypes, KdoW, ELW 1 and ELW 2 with the first one usually being a "normal" car and the last one having the size of a coach
Usually modified panel truck with basic means of firefighting. Those vehicles usually have a portable fire pump with an own engine instead of a fixed one that is powered by the vehicle's engine. The names of the TSF and TSF-W are actually derived from the German term "" which roughly translates into "portable self powered pump". Those vehicles are crewed by a German Staffel (0/1/5/6), but the TSF and the TSF-W types provide enough equipment for a group (0/1/8/9).
Typically a large truck manned by a group and carrying firefighting and rescue gear, nowadays usually with a small water (ranging from 800 to 2500 litres) and foam supply (60 or 120 litres depending on the type of fire engine). Although the crew of the LF consists of a group, the larger types of this engine carry enough equipment for two groups, which often includes a second, portable fire pump.
Similar to the engine (LF) but with far more rescue equipment (i.e. Jaws of Life and a winch) on board.
Very often they are equipped with water cannons on the roof and foam cannons.
Usually either a larger panel truck or a smaller truck, they are equipped with a broad range of rescue gear i.e. jaws of life, a winch, saws, cutters or work platforms
A vehicle that comes in all sizes, depending on the equipment stowed. Equipment might be specialized gear for water rescue operations or hazmat.
A large truck with a telescopic ladder (DL), often with an attached bucket or platform at the end (DLK). The most common type is the DLK 23–12, a ladder truck with a platform that can extend to 23 metres height while positioned 12 metres away. (Referred to »Truck« or »Tiller Truck«)
Typically large trucks with a supply of rolled or folded and pre-coupled hoses (usually 1000 m or 2000 m), in case longer distances have to be bridged. 
Usually a minivan or a small bus, used for non-emergency rides, organisational tours or transfer of additional personnel.
Typically based on a delivery-truck chassis with a special body, the RTW provides pre-hospital critical care for one patient. Crew consist of two EMT-I or EMT-P, sometimes augmented by an emergency physician (only when the fire department also operates an EMS).

German airport firefighting vehicles

Specialized vehicles are used by German airport fire departments. These include airport crash tenders. In German, they are called  (FLFs).  These normally have pumps with a large pumping capacity of 10,000 litres/min and have large supplies of either powder or foam (ranging between 300-800 litres) in addition to a standard water tank ranging from 6,000 to 13,000 litres.  German airports tend to use crash engines manufactured by Rosenbauer (Rosenbauer Simba, Rosenbauer Panther 8x8 MA 5 or the Rosenbauer Panther 6x6 CA 5).  Other manufacturers include Ziegler, Saval-Kronenburg, Amdac Carmichael International, Metz, E-One, Oshkosh, Sides, Magirus-Deutz/IVECO Magirus.

German military bases are protected by the Bundeswehr-Feuerwehr which currently have three generations of Feuerlösch-KFZ (FlKfz) engines in use.  These are specialized engines constructed in three different generations since 1958 and they use specialised military truck chassis (normally MAN/Unimog).  The first generation covers engines constructed between 1958 and 1978 (known as the FlKfz 2400).

The second-generation engines FlKfz 1000 (equipment manufacturer: Metz now part of Rosenbauer), FlKfz 3000 (equipment manufacturer: cooperation between Bachert and Albert Ziegler), FlKfz 3500/400/750 ((equipment manufacturer: cooperation between Bachert and Albert Ziegler) and FlKfz 8000/800 ((), (all constructed by Faun GmbH) except the FlKfz 1000 [constructed on a Mercedes Benz Unimog U 1300 L chassis] were first put into service in 1979.

The third generation entered active service in 2005.  Most of the older FlKfz 8000/800 were replaced by the new Ziegler Z8 ((FLF 80/125-12,5 Z8 "Advancer")).  Unlike the second-generation engines, this new series of 16 Z8 engines is no longer a military-specific design.  The first generation of FlKfz 2400 was replaced by LF 16/12 (originally based on the Daimler-Benz 1017 chassis) with the design changes being incorporated into the Mercedes-Benz Atego chassis.  Furthermore, the 3rd generation has been supplemented by the TLF 20-28 and the RW (Rüstwagen 2) on MAN 18.280 chassis as well as the TLF 20–45 on the Mercedes-Benz Unimog U 5000 chassis.  All of these vehicles were equipped by Ziegler.

More information on the military vehicles mentioned above are available below:

Standard ELW 1/command vehicle:
 
 

First generation:
 1st Generation
 FlKfz 3800-400

Second generation:
 FlKfz 1000
 FlKfz 2400
 FlKfz 3000
 FlKfz 3500
 FlKfz 8000

Third generation:
 U 5000a
 Z8
 LF 16/12 on MB Atego

Dispatching and alerting

Radios
German fire brigades all use two-way FM radio to coordinate their efforts. The German emergency currently use the so-called "BOS-Band" (BOS means Behörden und Organisationen mit Sicherheitsaufgaben, "authorities and organisations with security duties"), channels located in the 4-metre and 2-metre bands with a frequency range from 74.215 to 87.255 MHz (4m/base stations) and from 167.56 to 173.98 MHz (2m/portable radios).  There were plans to implement digitally scrambled trunked radio systems (a nationwide TETRA-based  system) located in many German cities by 2010.  This process was delayed in many cities due to either financial constraints (expenses due to setting up a whole new infrastructure and replacing numerous 4-meter base stations/mobile radios and 2-meter portable radios) or legislative delays.  The city of Aachen began testing a TETRA-based system in 2001 and has implemented it since 2003 after completion of the pilot project ,. 
An enormous advantage of the German BOS Radio System is that virtually every helping organisation in Germany like police, Rescue Services, THW, life-guard and fire brigades are using the same system in different channels so they can easily switch and communicate.
Typically, 4-meter-radios ,, are used by dispatch centres and on vehicles, whereas 2-metre-radios are handheld Handie-Talkies ,,, for tactical communication on scene.  Unlike in the US, 2-meter portable radios are normally only used for fireground/tactical communications and not for direct contact with the dispatch centre.  If direct communication is required, the engineer of the first-in engine will relay all messages directly to the dispatch center via the 4-meter radio on the engine.  However, a dispatch center can monitor and if necessary respond on a (non-)repeatered 2-metre tactical channel.  In most cases, German tactical channels are not used with a repeater.
In bigger areas, there is usually a number of relay stations/repeaters in place which repeat the signal, giving it more range and quality.

Identification
Radio identification names consist of five parts:
 Name of the organisation, i.e. "FLORIAN" for the fire services
 Name of the city or county the brigade is based, e.g. "MAGDEBURG"
 Two digits referring to the specific area or station, e.g. "01"
 Two digits referring to the type of vehicle, e.g. "33" for a ladder (Tiller truck)
 Two digits referring to which one it is, e.g. "01" for the first vehicle of its type.
For example, the radio identification "Florian Magdeburg 01-33-01" would describe the first ladder of station 1, operated by the Fire department of the city of Magdeburg.

Although not in accordance with the respective service regulation ("Dienstvorschrift"), these identifications are sometimes shortened for the sake of fast radio contact and when there can be no doubt that the vehicle is unique. For example, the  currently on scene may simply refer to himself as "1-11" or "Florian 1-11", instead of using the whole sequence when the crew is certain that there are no other companies involved.
Because the German Fire Services are terms of the federal states like Bavaria, Hesse or Berlin this may vary from state to state.  The radio identification name for the same ladder in Bavaria can be "Florian Geretsried 30/1" for example.

Alerting the fire stations
All fires or emergencies requiring assistance from the fire service can be reported using the toll-free European emergency telephone number "112". The caller will be connected to the command centre responsible for their area and can report the emergency.
The dispatcher will then decide whom to alert. If professional fire brigades are at the station, they will be alerted by klaxon, announcement or display messages. During the night, the alarm circuits are often wired to turn on the lights in the crew quarters.

Voluntary fire brigades are almost everywhere equipped with pagers, some only informing the firefighters of an emergency (spoken messages on a pager), some even displaying short messages (display pagers such as the Motorola LX2/LX2plus or LX4/LX4plus) with the type of call, incident address, map coordinates, time and date of call and other important details.  In some areas sirens are still in use, sometimes even as the primary means of alerting firefighters.

A few fire brigades are experimenting with a GSM-based alarm circuit. The firefighter will then get either a message on his mobile phone or a machine will call him. This method has proven successful in areas where constant radio contact for pagers can not be guaranteed, e.g. in mountainous areas.

Sports
To create an incentive for sports, fitness and health the German firefighting fitness badge can be awarded to any member of the German fire services.

See also
 Fire department
 Volunteer fire department

References

External links 
 German Armed Forces fire engines (third-generation) as well as a Flash movie of the Stuttgart Airport Fire Department responding to a call

Fire departments of Germany
Emergency services in Germany